Clara Eugenia López Obregón (born April 12, 1950) is a Colombian politician who was the Minister for Employment. She also served as Acting Mayor of Bogotá from 2011 to 2012. A Harvard-trained economist, she was the Alternative Democratic Pole's nominee for President of Colombia in the 2014 election.

López is also a University of Los Andes-trained lawyer with a doctorate from the University of Salamanca, and served as the sixth Auditor General of Colombia from 2003 to 2005.

Personal life
López was born on 12 April 1950 in Bogotá, Colombia to Álvaro López Holguín (grandson of Alfonso López Pumarejo) and Cecilia Obregón Rocha. (cousin of painter Alejandro Obregón Roses)

She attended Colegio Nueva Granada in Bogotá, but was later sent to live in McLean, Virginia in the United States, where she attended the Madeira School, a prestigious preparatory boarding school for girls. After graduating high school in 1968, she attended Harvard University where she became an active participant in the student movement opposed to United States involvement in the Vietnam War. She graduated with an A.B. magna cum laude in June 1972.

She was married on 13 September 1980 in Tenjo, Cundinamarca to Edmond Jacques Courtois Miller, a wealthy Canadian banker whom she met while in Harvard, but they later divorced after Courtois was charged and pleaded guilty to insider trading charges in New York in 1983, having peddled confidential takeover information while a vice president at Morgan Stanley's mergers and acquisitions department from 1974 to 1977. She later remarried to Carlos Romero Jiménez, whom she met while they both served in the Bogotá City Council. She has no children.

References

External links
 Biography by CIDOB

1950 births
Living people
Clara
Holguín family
Anti–Vietnam War activists
Harvard University alumni
University of Los Andes (Colombia) alumni
University of Salamanca alumni
Colombian economists
Colombian women lawyers
Colombian women in politics
New Liberalism (Colombia) politicians
Patriotic Union (Colombia) politicians
Alternative Democratic Pole politicians
Mayors of Bogotá
Candidates for President of Colombia
20th-century Colombian lawyers